This World and Body is the debut album by Marion released in 1996 on London Records. It reached number 10 in the UK Albums Chart. The album contained the singles "Sleep", "Toys for Boys", "Let's All Go Together" and "Time". The vinyl LP also contained a bonus one-sided 7" vinyl of a re-recording of the bands debut single, "Violent Men".

An expanded three CD set and a vinyl LP of the album was released by Demon Music Group on 16 September 2016.

Background and recording
Marion formed during the Madchester era after Jamie Harding started a friendship with former Smiths manager Joe Moss. The group was named after Harding's grandmother and the real name for actor John Wayne. Shortly after this, the line-up consisted of Harding on vocals, Tony Grantham on guitar, Phil Cunningham on guitar, Julian Philips on bass and Murad Mousa on drums. Philips was replaced by Nick Gilbert sometime later. Moss secured them a rehearsal room in the basement of The Night and Day Café in Manchester. They spent weeks writing and rehearsing material over a nine month period, before they decided to play shows in London. "Violent Men", the band's debut single, was released through Rough Trade Records; a bidding war between major labels ensued, with the band signing to Island Music Publishing and London Recordings in October 1994. Harding said the music press tagged them as part of the Britpop movement, which the band "felt [...] was a curse".

They did a session for BBC Radio 1 in January 1995, where they performed "Toys for Boys" and "I Stopped Dancing", and played "Sleep" on The Word the following month. Shortly afterwards, they did "The Only Way" and "My Children" for a Mark Radcliffe session at the end of February 1995. Morrissey saw Marion live twice and invited them to support him on his Boxers tour, before supporting Radiohead a month after. This World and Body was recorded at The Chapel in South Thoresby with producer Al Clay; it was then mixed at The Church in London. Harding said Clay had been chosen as they had wanted to re-create their live sound as closely as they could, and he was "known for being an incredible live producer".

Release
Marion played another Radcliffe session in January 1996, performing "Fallen Through", "Time" and "All for Love". This World and Body was released in February 1996; its artwork was taken at the Arndale Centre in Manchester. Discussing the title, Harding said "it's what the songs are about – our world and our bodies. It couldn't be more simple". The band did another BBC Radio 1 session in July 1996, playing "Vanessa", "Wait" and "Your Body Lies".

Track listing 
All songs by Jamie Harding, Tony Grantham and Phil Cunningham, lyrics by Harding.

 "Fallen Through" – 3:45
 "Sleep" – 3:05
 "Let's All Go Together" – 3:08
 "Wait" – 3:59
 "The Only Way" – 2:34
 "I Stopped Dancing" – 3:00
 "All for Love" – 3:56
 "Toys for Boys" – 3:07
 "Time" – 4:15
 "Vanessa" – 3:59
 "Your Body Lies" – 3:45
 "My Children" – 4:51

Personnel
Personnel per deluxe edition booklet.

Marion
 Jaime Harding - vocals, harmonica
 Tony Grantham - guitar, piano
 Phil Cunningham - guitar
 Nick Gilbert - bass
 Murad Mousa - drums, percussion

Production and design
 Al Clay – producer
 Donald Milne – photography

Charts

References
Citations

Sources

 
 
 

Marion (band) albums
1996 debut albums
London Records albums